Motu Moute is a  island in the Bora Bora Islands Group, within the Society Islands of French Polynesia. It is the located between Vananui, and Moute Iti.

The island is part of Bora Bora Commune. The nearest airport is Bora Bora Airport.

References